The National Basketball League of Canada's Canadian of the Year Award is an annual National Basketball League of Canada (NBL) award given since the 2011–12 season. Three of the first four players to been named Canadian of the Year had competed with the Rainmen in that season.

Winners

References 

National Basketball League of Canada awards